is a railway station in Higashinada-ku, Kobe, Hyōgo Prefecture, Japan. It is owned and operated by private operator Hanshin Electric Railway.

Layout
This station consists of two opposed elevated side platforms serving two tracks.

History 
Fukae Station opened on April 12, 1905 along with the rest of the Hanshin Main Line.

On January 17, 1995, the station was damaged by the Great Hanshin earthquake. Service in the affected area was restored by June 26, 1995.

Station numbering was introduced on 21 December 2013, with Fukae being designated as station number HS-21.

Between April 2009 and November 2019, the line between Sumiyoshi Station and Ashiya Station underwent grade separation. The elevated westbound tracks opened for service in December 2015 while the eastbound tracks opened for service on November 30, 2019.

Gallery

References

External links 

 Station website (in Japanese)

Railway stations in Japan opened in 1905
Railway stations in Hyōgo Prefecture